Quirós is a municipality in the Autonomous Community of the Principality of Asturias, Spain. To the southeast is the municipality of Lena, to the south lies the Autonomous Community of León, to the northeast Riosa and Morcín, to the north is Santo Adriano, to the northwest is Proaza, and to the west is Teverga. Castillo de Alba was a notable fortress here in medieval times, today in ruins.

Overview
The province is within the Cantabrian Mountains and around 30 kilometres from the Asturian capital city of Oviedo.  The municipality is a small one, encompassing some 40 towns and villages.  Much of the municipality is protected landscape.  There are numerous species of flora, including oak trees, chestnut trees, holly, birch trees and groves of alder.  Local wildlife includes bears, wolves, foxes, otters, squirrels, wild boars, eagles, vultures and trout.  The economy is based on cattle ranching, tourism and farming.

Parishes
 Arroxo
 Bárzana
 Bermiego
 Casares
 Chanuces
 Cinfuegos
 Las Agüeras
 Ḷḷindes
 Murieḷḷos
 Nimbra
 Pedroveya
 Ricao
 Salceo

References

External links

 Quiros official website

Municipalities in Asturias